Jan Pytlick (born 5 June 1967) is a Danish handball coach, and trains Saudi Arabia national team. He was head coach for the Danish women's national handball team from 1998 to 2006, and again from 2007 to 2014. Pytlick has led the women's national team to victory in two Summer Olympics, as they became Olympic Champions in 2000, and again in 2004. After the team's flop at the 2014 European Women's Handball Championship, DHF and Pytlick agreed to end cooperation.

References

1967 births
Living people
Danish handball coaches
Olympic coaches
People from Svendborg Municipality
Sportspeople from the Region of Southern Denmark